Bangarapet Assembly constituency is one of the 224 constituencies in the Karnataka Legislative Assembly of Karnataka a south state of India. It is also part of Kolar Lok Sabha constituency.

Members of Legislative Assembly

Mysore State
 1951: K. Chengalaraya Reddy, Indian National Congress

 1957: E. Narayana Gowda, Independent

 1962: E. Narayana Gowda, Independent

 1967-1973: Seat did not exist

Karnataka State
 1973-2008: Seat did not exist

 2008: M. Narayanaswamy, Indian National Congress

 2011 (By-Poll): M. Narayanaswamy, Bharatiya Janata Party

 2013: S. N. Narayanaswamy K. M., Indian National Congress

See also
 Kolar district
 List of constituencies of Karnataka Legislative Assembly

References

Assembly constituencies of Karnataka
Kolar district